Purchas Hill (also Te Tauoma) is one of the volcanoes in the Auckland volcanic field. 

Purchas Hill was a twin-cratered scoria cone around 50 metres high, located north of Maungarei / Mount Wellington, before it was predominantly quarried away. The scoria cone sat in the middle of its large explosion crater with a surrounding tuff ring. It erupted about 10,000 years ago, shortly before the eruption of its larger neighbour, Mount Wellington.

History 

Te Tauoma was the site where the Ngāi Tai descendants of Te Kete-ana-taua lived, often fighting with nearby Ngāi Tāhuhu who lived around Ōtāhuhu / Mount Richmond.

In the mid 1800s, geologist Ferdinand von Hochstetter named the mountain after the Reverend Dr Arthur Guyon Purchas (1821-1906), in gratitude for his help with geological work on the field.

The scant remnants of Purchas Hill lie on what is largely a wasteland in the suburb of Stonefields in Auckland.

The road Purchas Hill Drive is located where Purchas Hill used to be.

References
City of Volcanoes: A geology of Auckland - Searle, Ernest J.; revised by Mayhill, R.D.; Longman Paul, 1981. First published 1964. .
Volcanoes of Auckland: The Essential Guide. Hayward, B.W., Murdoch, G., Maitland, G.; Auckland University Press, 2011.
Volcanoes of Auckland: A Field Guide. Hayward, B.W.; Auckland University Press, 2019, 335 pp. .

External links
  View looking north from Mount Wellington in 1921, with Purchas Hill in foreground.
1850s diagram of Mt Wellington and Purchas Hill.

Auckland volcanic field